The All India Konkani Parishad is a national conference held in India.  It is meant to support the Konkani people and Konkani language, and conducts various activities to achieve that goal, aided by local authorities

History
The Konkani Parishad was launched when India's struggle for freedom was at its peak.  The organisation was founded by the late Madhav Manjunath Shanbhague of Kumta, Karnataka, on 8 July 1939.  It shifted to Goa, the homeland of Konkani, in 1961 when the territory was liberated from Portuguese rulers. At present, it functions from Goa as the national apex body to which 16 regional/local associations are affiliated and works for the development of Konkani language, literature, culture, education, etc. across the country.
 
The Konkani Parishad had set the following objectives before it in 1939

 To bring about unity among the Konkani speaking people of various regions
 To remove indifference of Konkanis towards their mother tongue and promote their love for the language
 To strive for standardisation of the Konkani language
 To promote use of Devanagari as the natural, common script for Konkani
 To work for the development and spread of Konkani literature and culture.

During the past 75 years, the Parishad relentlessly worked, mostly through its national conferences for achieving its objectives.  It has so far organized 29 biennial sessions and 22 biennial Konkani literary Conferences apart from innumerable other programmes at the national level.

These conferences were always graced by linguists like Dr. Suniti Kumar Chatterjee and Dr. S.M. Katre, and intellectuals like Kakasaheb Kalelkar and prominent litterateurs of various languages of the country.

The Parishad has always been in the forefront in fighting for the issues daunting the Konkani language.  It identified and deliberated on the various problems related to the development of the language and prepared strategies for solving them. The following resolutions passed during the conferences throw light on the various issues agitating the minds of the Konkanies from time to time.

 Inclusion of Konkani programmes in all India Radio and Doordarshan
 Introduction of Konkani in school and college education and preparation of Konkani textbooks
 Making Konkani available books in public libraries
 Establishment of Konkani Bhasha Mandals in various states
 Getting advertisements for Konkani periodicals
 Recognition of the language by Sahitya Akademi, New Delhi
 Inclusion of Konkani in the 8th schedule of the country’s constitution
 Official language status for Konkani in Goa
 Statehood for Goa
 Establishment of state academies for Konkani in Goa, Karnataka, Kerala and Maharashtra

These resolutions were persistently followed up and, by and large, their purposes were achieved. The major issues which exercised the minds of the people at the Parishad's meets were satisfactorily settled when Konkani was recognised as an independent language by Sahitya Akademi, New Delhi in 1976 and the language attained the status of official language in Goa in 1987. The crowning glory came when Konkani was included in the 8th Schedule of the country’s constitution in 1992.

These landmarks in the history of Konkani language were followed by establishment of Konkani Academies in Goa, Karnataka and recently in Kerala. The progress achieved in teaching Konkani from primary school level to post-graduate level in the colleges and its increased use in administration and mass media is also due to the direct and indirect efforts of the Parishad.

Sessions
Brief details of the sessions of the Parishad are as below:

See also
 Canara Konkani
 Shenoi Goembab
 Madhav Manjunath Shanbhag
 World Konkani Hall Of Fame

References

Konkani
Politics of Goa
Politics of Karnataka
Politics of Kerala
Politics of Maharashtra